Widen is a municipality in Switzerland.

Widen or Widén may also refer to:
 
Widen, West Virginia, community in United States
Widen (company), American software company
WiDEN, Wideband Integrated Digital Enhanced Network, software

People with the surname
Bernard A. Widen (1920–2017), American dentist and artist
Gregory Widen (active 1986-), American screenwriter and director
Peter Widén (born 1967), Swedish pole-vaulter
Pontus Widén (1920–1983), Swedish bandy player
Raphael Widen (died 1833), American pioneer and politician
Sara Widén (1981–2014), Swedish opera singer